Ahlqvist is a Swedish surname. Notable people with the surname include:

Aleksis Ahlqvist (born 1986), Finnish ice hockey player
August Ahlqvist (1826–1889), Finnish poet, writer and literary critic
Birgitta Ahlqvist (born 1948), Swedish politician
Pepe Ahlqvist (born 1956), Finnish musician
Thure Ahlqvist (1907–1983), Swedish boxer

See also
11305 Ahlqvist, a main-belt minor planet
Ahlquist, a surname

Swedish-language surnames